Park Jae-hong is a Korean name consisting of the family name Park and the given name Jae-hong. It may refer to:

 Park Jae-hong (baseball) (born 1973)
 Park Jae-hong (footballer born 1978)
 Park Jae-hong (footballer born 1990)